Childeric (also Childerich or Childéric) was the name of several Frankish kings:

 Childeric I (c.440–481)
 Childeric II (c.653–673)
 Childeric III (c.717–754)

See also 
 Hilderic (disambiguation)
 Childeric Muller, French TV personality and politician